Michelle Lynn Monaghan (born March 23, 1976) is an American actress. She has starred in the films Kiss Kiss Bang Bang (2005), Gone Baby Gone (2007), Made of Honor (2008), Eagle Eye (2008), Trucker (2008), Source Code (2011), Pixels (2015), and Patriots Day (2016). She also received recognition for her starring role as Julia Meade in the action spy film series Mission: Impossible, and her appearances in Mission: Impossible III (2006), Mission: Impossible – Ghost Protocol (2011),  Mission: Impossible – Fallout (2018), and Echoes (2022).

On television, Monaghan starred as Maggie Hart in the first season of the anthology crime drama series True Detective (2014), for which she was nominated for the Golden Globe Award for Best Supporting Actress. She starred as Sarah Lane in the drama series The Path (2016–18). She played the role of Eva Geller in the 2020 Netflix thriller series Messiah; it was cancelled after one season.

Early life

Monaghan was born in the small town (then a population of about 750) of Winthrop, Iowa, the daughter of Sharon (Hammel) and Robert Monaghan, a factory worker. She has two older brothers, Bob and John. She has mostly Irish and German ancestry, and was raised Catholic.

She graduated from East Buchanan High School in 1994. After graduation she moved to Chicago to study journalism at Columbia College Chicago and began to model. She modeled in Milan, Singapore, Tokyo and Hong Kong, as well as in the United States. With one semester remaining to complete her journalism degree in 1999, she left for New York to pursue an acting career. She worked as a model, appearing in several magazines and catalogs, before making her acting debut.

Career
Monaghan's first two credited television appearances, in a supporting role, were as Caroline Busse in episodes of Young Americans, which aired in 2000. She also performed on Law & Order: Special Victims Unit in "Consent", an episode that was broadcast on January 19, 2001, and she made her big-screen debut that same year in Perfume, playing the part of Henrietta. Her next film, again in a supporting role, was in 2002 in Unfaithful, starring Richard Gere and Diane Lane.

Monaghan got a big-break role in 2002 when she co-starred in the television series Boston Public playing the role of Kimberly Woods. After guest-starring for a season, she returned to film appearing in It Runs in the Family in 2003, Winter Solstice in 2004, and starring with Robert Downey Jr. and Val Kilmer in Kiss Kiss Bang Bang in 2005. She also appears in Constantine in 2005, but her role in that film was essentially cut, with her scenes viewable on the DVD under "deleted scenes".

In 2007 she co-starred with Ben Stiller in The Heartbreak Kid remake, and with Casey Affleck in Gone Baby Gone. In 2008, she co-starred with Patrick Dempsey in Made of Honor, and co-starred with Shia LaBeouf in Eagle Eye. She starred alongside Jake Gyllenhaal in Source Code. She played the role of Diane Ford in Trucker.

In 2014 Monaghan starred in the first season of HBO anthology series True Detective.

In April 2016 Monaghan joined the principal cast of Shawn Christensen's independent feature film The Vanishing of Sidney Hall, which began filming later that month. Nine months later, on January 25, 2017, the film premiered at the Sundance Film Festival.

In May 2018 it was announced that Monaghan had been cast in the main role of CIA operative Eva Geller in the Netflix thriller Messiah. The series premiered on Netflix on January 1, 2020 and was cancelled after one season.

Personal life
Monaghan met Australian graphic artist Peter White at a party in 2000. They married in Port Douglas, Queensland in August 2005 and live in New York. She gave birth to their daughter in 2008, and their son on October 30, 2013.

Filmography

Film

Television

References

External links

 
 Michelle Monaghan interview at reviewgraveyard.com
 Profile of Michelle Monaghan

1976 births
20th-century American actresses
21st-century American actresses
Actresses from Iowa
Female models from Iowa
American film actresses
American people of German descent
American people of Irish descent
American television actresses
Living people
People from Buchanan County, Iowa